Raymond Parks may refer to:
 Raymond Parks, husband of civil rights campaigner Rosa Parks
 Raymond Parks (auto racing) (1914–2010), NASCAR